The discography of Swedish recording artist Amy Deasismont, consists of five studio albums, one compilation album, eighteen official singles and counting. Deasismont became popular in 2005, when she released her platinum-certificated single "What's in It for Me". The song is her biggest hit to date, remaining in the top ten in Sweden, Denmark, Norway and Poland. This Is Me Now, the singer's first studio album, was released after the huge success of "What's in It for Me", in 2005 in several European countries - it became popular in the Scandinavian countries and was certified Platinum by the IFPI in Sweden. Her later albums and singles were not as popular as her debut releases, but was somewhat successful in Sweden.

Albums

Studio albums

Compilations

Singles

 Promotional singles
 2008 - "En helt ny jul" from En helt ny jul album
 2010 - "Ready to Fly" from Greatest Hits album

References

External links
 

Pop music discographies
Discographies of Swedish artists